is a Japanese athlete. He competed in the men's 200 metres event at the 2019 World Athletics Championships.

References

External links

1997 births
Living people
Japanese male sprinters
Place of birth missing (living people)
World Athletics Championships athletes for Japan
Athletes (track and field) at the 2014 Summer Youth Olympics
Athletes (track and field) at the 2018 Asian Games
Universiade medalists in athletics (track and field)
Universiade gold medalists for Japan
Medalists at the 2017 Summer Universiade
Medalists at the 2019 Summer Universiade
Asian Games competitors for Japan
Athletes (track and field) at the 2020 Summer Olympics
Olympic athletes of Japan